Ambatomainty is a rural municipality in Madagascar. It belongs to the district of Ikalamavony District, which is a part of Haute Matsiatra Region. The population of the commune was estimated to be approximately 12,421 in 2018.

Only primary schooling is available. The majority 95% of the population of the commune are farmers, while an additional 5% receives their livelihood from raising livestock. The most important crop is rice, while other important products are peanuts, beans and cassava.

Roads
The partly unpaved National road 42 links the town to Isorana and Fianarantsoa.

See also
Ranotsara - a fonkontany (village) of this municipality.

References and notes 

Populated places in Haute Matsiatra